Plum Island is an island in Lake Michigan in the southern part of the town of Washington in Door County, off the tip of the Door Peninsula in the U.S. state of Wisconsin. Carp Lake is located on the northwestern side. During years when Lake Michigan's water levels are high, it is a lagoon of Lake Michigan, but it gets cut off as a separate lake during low water years.

The island is a bird sanctuary under control of the United States Fish and Wildlife Service and part of the Green Bay National Wildlife Refuge. and is also open to the public for recreational purposes. The island also holds the unmanned Plum Island Range Lights.

History 
The border between Wisconsin and Michigan was originally defined as "the most usual ship channel" into Green Bay from Lake Michigan but commercial routes existed both to the north and south of the island which led to a border dispute.  In 1936, the U.S. Supreme Court decision Wisconsin v. Michigan found that Plum and other nearby islands were part of Wisconsin.

Climate

View on the north side of the island

Nearby islands

References

Plum Island: Block 2128, Block Group 2, Census Tract 9801, Door County, Wisconsin United States Census Bureau
"Speaker will discuss Plum Island bird survey", Beaver Dam Daily Citizen, Friday, December 9, 2005

External links 
 Plum Island Trail Map, USFWS (Archived September 5, 2021)
 Plum Island visit website, USFWS
 Plum Island, Web-Map of Door County, Wisconsin

Uninhabited islands of Wisconsin
Islands of Door County, Wisconsin
Lake islands of Wisconsin
Islands of Lake Michigan in Wisconsin
Protected areas of Door County, Wisconsin
Former disputed islands